Hornchurch is a London Underground station serving the town of Hornchurch in the London Borough of Havering, east London.

The station was originally opened on 1 May 1885 by the London, Tilbury and Southend Railway on a new direct route from London to Southend that avoided Tilbury. The Southend service was withdrawn from Hornchurch and the original platforms abandoned in 1962.

The single-storey brick building is of a common design also constructed at other stations on the eastern portion of the line at the time.

History

Steam era
The original 1854 route of the London, Tilbury and Southend Railway passed through the south of the parish of Hornchurch near the River Thames without stopping; the nearest station was at Rainham. Between 1885 and 1888 a new route authorised as the Barking and Pitsea Railway was constructed, that provided a direct service from Fenchurch Street to Southend, avoiding Tilbury. The station at Hornchurch opened on 1 May 1885; the next station to the east was Upminster and to the west was Dagenham. The Whitechapel and Bow Railway opened in 1902 and allowed through services of the Metropolitan District Railway to operate as far as Upminster. The District Railway converted to electric trains in 1905 and services were lost at Hornchurch as they were cut back to East Ham. The London, Tilbury and Southend Railway was purchased by the Midland Railway in 1912 and was amalgamated into the London, Midland and Scottish Railway on 1 January 1923.

Underground electric

The District Railway electric service was extended east from East Ham to Barking in 1908. Delayed by World War I, an additional pair of electrified fourth rail tracks were extended by the London, Midland and Scottish Railway to Upminster and services of the District resumed at Hornchurch in 1932. To coincide with the introduction of electric services, the station was rebuilt with two additional platforms and a new ticket office spanning the tracks facing onto Station Lane. The Metropolitan District Railway amalgamated with several other transport concerns to form London Transport in 1933, and became known as the District line. A new station at Upminster Bridge became the next station to the east in 1934 and Elm Park was added to the west in 1935. The 1947 timetable shows only a few services a day provided by the London, Midland and Scottish Railway and a frequent service provided by the District.

British Railways
After nationalisation of the railways in 1948 management of the station passed to British Railways. The remaining Fenchurch Street–Southend services were withdrawn in 1962 when the route was electrified with overhead lines. Barking station was reconfigured to provide cross-platform interchange between District line and Fenchurch Street services. The continued management of the station by an organisation now providing none of the services became more of an anomaly and in 1969 ownership transferred to the London Underground which came under the authority of the London Transport Executive of the Greater London Council.

Design

The station consists of two side platforms—numbered 1 for westbound and 2 for eastbound—located either side of the running tracks. There are four tracks through the site, with the platforms located on the northern pair. Another pair of tracks to the south are used by c2c outer suburban services and there are disused platforms on those lines. The operational platforms are mostly covered by station canopies with a waiting room and toilets on the westbound platform. The red brick ticket office is located at street level above the platforms, to which it is connected by a covered footbridge stairway. The 1930s architecture is similar in design to Becontree and Dagenham East and is contemporary with the introduction of electric services. The platform benches are of Midland Railway (1912–1922) design. The station had a track crossover, to the west of the platforms, enabling trains to terminate there and return to service in the opposite direction. However, this was removed in 2016.

As part of the public–private partnership arrangement for maintenance of the London Underground, the station was due to be refurbished by Metronet. Following the collapse of Metronet, responsibility of station upkeep was transferred to Transport for London in 2008. Works were planned to include provision of tactile strips and colour contrasted handrails for the visually impaired, installation of closed-circuit television cameras, passenger help points, new electronic departure information displays on the platforms, a new public address system, and improved lighting. Transport for London has assigned the station to the 'limited works' category and plans to complete these improvements incrementally, according to the need to preserve assets. The station does not have step free access from the platforms to the street, although there are two out of use lift shafts from the platforms to the booking hall.

Location

The station is located on Station Lane in the London Borough of Havering and is surrounded by a cluster of shops. It is in a primarily residential area and is near to St George's Hospital and Hornchurch Country Park. A 68 space station car park, managed by National Car Parks, is accessed from Naunton Way.

London Buses routes 165, 193, 248, 252, 256, 370, 372 and school routes 646, 648 and 652 serve the station, providing connections to Collier Row, County Park Estate, Cranham, Lakeside Shopping Centre, Noak Hill, Queen's Hospital, Rainham, Romford and St George's Hospital.

Services
The station is in London fare zone 6. The typical off-peak service from the station is twelve District line trains per hour to Upminster and twelve to Earl's Court, of which six continue to Ealing Broadway and six continue to Richmond. At peak periods the number of trains per hour increases to fifteen and some trains continue from Earl's Court to Wimbledon. Services towards central London operate from approximately 05:00 to 23:30 and services to Upminster operate from approximately 06:00 to 01:30. The journey time to Upminster is four minutes; to Barking is approximately 15 minutes, and to Tower Hill is approximately 40 minutes. The station has a ticket office that is open for eleven hours a week. During 2011 there were 1.98 million passenger entries and exits at the station, higher than the annual usage over the preceding two years, and typical for a suburban station.

References

External links

Platforms of Hornchurch station  1914

District line stations
Tube stations in the London Borough of Havering
Former London, Tilbury and Southend Railway stations
Railway stations in Great Britain opened in 1885
Tube station